DPH may refer to:

Arts
Designated hitter in baseball ("designated pinch hitter")
Digital planar holography

Government and law
Georgia Department of Public Health
Los Angeles County Department of Public Health
Daň z přidané hodnoty, the Value Added Tax in the Czech Republic
Daň z pridanej hodnoty, the Value Added Tax in Slovakia

Health and medicine
Diphenylhydantoin, commonly used antiepileptic; see Phenytoin
Diphenhydramine, a first generation antihistamine mainly used to treat allergies
Doctor of Public Health

Science and engineering
Diamond Pyramid Hardness; see Vickers hardness test
Daytime parahypnagogia
Diphenylhexatriene, a fluorescent hydrocarbon used in the study of cell membranes.
Discrete phase-type distribution in Markov chain theory